Gerald Gendall Fuller (born April 7, 1953) is a Canadian/American chemical engineer and Fletcher Jones II Professor of Chemical Engineering at Stanford University.

Fuller received his B.S. in chemical engineering from the University of Calgary in 1975 and his PhD in chemical engineering from Caltech in 1980.

He is a participant in Stanford's CPIMA, a joint venture with the University of California and IBM.

He is known for his work on the rheology of complex fluid interfaces. Work in the Fuller lab on biocompatible structures has applications in tissue engineering. Fuller has also authored a textbook on the optical rheometry of complex fluids.

In 2005, Fuller was elected as a member into the National Academy of Engineering for contributions to our understanding of the rheology of complex fluids and fluid interfaces and the development of unique rheo-optical techniques.

References

External links
Fuller Faculty Page
Fuller CPIMA Page

21st-century American chemists
Fellows of the American Physical Society
Living people
California Institute of Technology alumni
1953 births
Stanford University School of Engineering faculty
Members of the United States National Academy of Engineering
University of Calgary alumni